Ernst is an unincorporated community in Clark County, Illinois, United States. Ernst is located along Illinois Route 1 south of Marshall.

References

Unincorporated communities in Clark County, Illinois
Unincorporated communities in Illinois